Malkapur railway station (MKU) is in Malkapur, a town in the Buldhana district of Maharashtra, India. There are many trains going through Malkapur railway station.

History
The first train in India travelled from Mumbai to Thane on 16 April 1853. By May 1854, Great Indian Peninsula Railway's Bombay–Thane line was extended to Kalyan.  Bhusawal railway station was set up in 1860 and in 1867 the GIPR branch line was extended to Nagpur.

Electrification
The railways in the section were electrified in 1989–90.

Amenities
Amenities at Malkapur railway station include: retiring room,  waiting room, light refreshment stall, and book stall.

Important trains passing from station is:-
 Hazur Sahib Nanded–Jammu Tavi Hamsafar Express
 Navajivan SF Express
 Gitanjali Express
 Amravati–Mumbai CSMT Superfast Express
 Secunderabad–Hisar Express (via Surat, Ahmedabad, Jodhpur, Bikaner)
 Hazur Sahib Nanded–Shri Ganganagar Weekly Express (via Jalgaon, Surat, Ahmedabad, Abu Road, Jodhpur, Bikaner)
 Jaipur–Hyderabad SF Express
 Hazur Sahib Nanded–Shri Ganganagar Superfast Express (via Abohar)
 Howrah Mail
 Vidarbha Express
 Prerana Express
 Hazur Sahib Nanded–Shri Ganganagar Superfast Express (via Hanumangarh)
 Puri–Ahmedabad Express
 Maharashtra Express
 Ahmedabad–Howrah Superfast Express
 Gandhidham–Puri Express
 Malda Town–Surat Express
 Gandhidham–Vishakhapatnam Weekly Express
 Kolkata–Lokmanya Tilak Terminus Kurla Express
 Ajmer–Puri Express.

References

Railway stations in Buldhana district
Bhusawal railway division
Railway stations opened in 1867